Echoes is the sixth in the series of Time Hunter novellas and features the characters Honoré Lechasseur and Emily Blandish from Daniel O'Mahony's Doctor Who novella The Cabinet of Light.
It is written by Iain McLaughlin and Claire Bartlett.

The novella is also available in a limited edition hardback, signed by the authors

External links
 Telos Publishing - Echoes

Time Hunter
2005 novels